Gerra is a genus of moths in the family Noctuidae. The genus was erected by Francis Walker in 1865.

Species
 Gerra aelia H. Druce, 1889
 Gerra brephos Draudt, 1919
 Gerra lunata Köhler, 1936
 Gerra radiata Becker, 2010
 Gerra radicalis Walker, 1865
 Gerra sevorsa Grote, 1882
 Gerra sevorsa aedessa H. Druce, 1889
 Gerra sophocles Dyar, 1912

References

Agaristinae